Maisoncelles is the name or part of the name of several communes in France.

Maisoncelles, Haute-Marne, in the Haute-Marne département 
Maisoncelles, Sarthe, in the Sarthe département
Maisoncelles-du-Maine, in the Mayenne département 
Maisoncelles-en-Brie, in the Seine-et-Marne département 
Maisoncelles-en-Gâtinais, in the Seine-et-Marne département 
Maisoncelles la Jourdan, in the Calvados département 
Maisoncelles-Pelvey, in the Calvados département 
Maisoncelles sur Ajon, in the Calvados département
Maisoncelle, in the Pas-de-Calais département 
Maisoncelle-et-Villers, in the Ardennes département 
Maisoncelle-Saint-Pierre, in the Oise département 
Maisoncelle-Tuilerie, in the Oise département